Juan Estiven Vélez Upegui (born in Medellín, Antioquia. 9 February 1982) is a retired Colombian footballer.

He can play as a left back defender or defensive midfielder. He has been capped for the Colombian NT in 2006 and has been a starter ever since the 2007 Copa America.

After impressive showings during World Cup Qualifiers he was being looked at by many European sides and was rumored to be going to France after an impressive win against Argentina in WCQs. After he was dropped from the NT in the European tour against France and Ireland, his chances at Europe seemed to have been ended.

Honours
Ulsan Hyundai
 AFC Champions League (1): 2012

References

External links

 
 

1982 births
Living people
Colombian footballers
Footballers from Medellín
Colombian expatriate footballers
Categoría Primera A players
Deportes Quindío footballers
Deportivo Pereira footballers
Atlético Nacional footballers
Ulsan Hyundai FC players
Jeju United FC players
J1 League players
J2 League players
Tokushima Vortis players
Vissel Kobe players
K League 1 players
Expatriate footballers in South Korea
Colombia international footballers
Colombian expatriate sportspeople in South Korea
Expatriate footballers in Japan
Association football fullbacks
Association football midfielders